Majenica is an unincorporated community in Lancaster Township, Huntington County, Indiana, United States.

History
Majenica was the name of an Indian chief.

Geography

References

Unincorporated communities in Huntington County, Indiana
Unincorporated communities in Indiana